Ismael Betancourt Lebrón (July 27, 1930 - June 5, 2014) was a Puerto Rican lawyer when he joined the public service in the newly established Commonwealth in 1956. He was district attorney in San Juan and superintendent for the Puerto Rico Police Department between 1989 and 1992, during the governorship of Rafael Hernández Colón.

Puerto Rico Police Department
During his time in the police, among other initiatives, it amended the regulation of police recruitment to include two psychological tests and one polygraph test for applicants. Betancourt Lebrón defended increased academic levels to enter the police and favored the professionalization of the Puerto Rico Police.

Death
He died on June 5, 2014 while been hospitalized at Pavia Hospital in Santurce, Puerto Rico due to a heart arrest. He was buried at Cementerio Borinquen Memorial in Caguas, Puerto Rico.

See also
 List of Superintendents of the Puerto Rico Police

References

External links
http://ocpipr.blogspot.com/2014/06/muere-el-ex-superintendente-de-la.html 
http://www.primerahora.com/noticias/policiatribunales/nota/muereelexsuperintendentedelapoliciaismaelbetancourtlebron-1014216/

1930 births
2014 deaths
People from San Sebastián, Puerto Rico
Puerto Rican police officers
Superintendents of the Puerto Rico Police